Craig Dykema (born June 11, 1959) is a retired American professional basketball small forward who spent the 1981–82 National Basketball Association (NBA) season with the Phoenix Suns. He was drafted in the 1981 NBA draft by the Suns from California State University, Long Beach.

External links

1959 births
Living people
American expatriate basketball people in Spain
American men's basketball players
Basketball players from California
Liga ACB players
Long Beach City Vikings men's basketball players
Long Beach State Beach men's basketball players
People from Lakewood, California
Phoenix Suns draft picks
Phoenix Suns players
Small forwards
Sportspeople from Los Angeles County, California